Man Mountain Marko (Michael Marko) is a fictional supervillain appearing in American comic books published by Marvel Comics. Marko was and remains an affiliate of numerous organized-crime entities in the Marvel universe, including the Maggia.

He was allied with Silvermane, Caesar Cicero, Eel I, and Nightshade. His most frequent enemies are Spider-Man, Power Man, Iron Fist, Thunderbolt, and Boomerang. He appears to have no relation to Cain Marko, seen in various Marvel titles as the Juggernaut, despite similarities in surname, physique and superpowers.

Publication history
Man Mountain Marko first appeared in The Amazing Spider-Man #73 and created by Stan Lee and John Romita Sr.

Fictional character biography
Marko is first seen as Silvermane's loyal lieutenant in an incident dealing with an ancient tablet which he steals. He attacks Curtis Connors when he thinks the formula he created has killed Silvermane. Marko is quickly defeated by Spider-Man.

Marko and some of his colleagues rob the Debutante Ball of Millie Hogarth. Unfortunately, for them, Millie's father is the agent for Power Man and Iron Fist, who were called in to defeat the villains. Man Mountain Marko later assisted Caesar Cicero's men into attacking Luke Cage and Big Ben Donovan.

During a trip to gather protection money, Marko has some sort of breakdown and trashes an entire bar, with Spider-Man inside of it. Investigative reporter Ben Urich tells Spider-Man that Marko has apparently also kidnapped a child. Ben knows of a facility where Marko is known to work out. Spider-Man finds steroids in Marko's locker. The owner of the gym tells him that the Maggia genetically altered Marko in order to make him stronger. Spider-Man steals information from the Maggia and confronts Marko at his home. Eventually Marko is subdued and it turns out the kid he 'kidnapped' simply had a twisted sense of hero worship, admiring Marko's size and strength.

Man Mountain Marko is later seen as a sexually threatening hitman sent after private investigator Jessica Jones. This was part of a conspiracy by a powerful business magnate who wished to use Jones and Captain America as a way to humiliate the current President of the United States. Jones severely beats Marko, then literally throws him at the businessman's feet. Marko and his bosses are soon arrested by S.H.I.E.L.D.

During the Civil War storyline, Man Mountain Marko was visible among an army of super-villains organized by Hammerhead that was captured by Iron Man and S.H.I.E.L.D. agents.

During the Manifest Destiny storyline, Marko develops a singing career focusing on the concept of violence against female super-heroes. While on a plane with the super-hero Dazzler he becomes enraged over the perceived lack of alcohol. He injures passengers and takes a hostage, he breaks the hostage's wrist to prove he is serious. Dazzler, at low power, manages to subdue him.

During the Dark Reign storyline, Marko is later sent by Norman Osborn as part of a fact finding mission to an 'Atlas' facility run by a younger Jimmy Woo. Atlas is an international crime organization that is working against the government's interests. Marko is working as the head of a squad of B.A.T.F.E. government agents. Marko's forces including a seeming snitch that had been advising the government on the activities of Atlas. Marko, against the recommendation Bureau of Alcohol, Tobacco, Firearms and Explosivess of his guides, rushes off the recommended path to follow the snitch. The man is really Jimmy Woo. Before Marko can do anything about the situation, he is eaten by a sentient dragon named Lao. This was against Woo's wishes. Marko is replaced by another super-powered strongman, the Grizzly.

Marko is revealed to have somehow survived when he is hired onto the Sinister Sixteen by Boomerang and Owl. After being manipulated and abandoned by Boomerang, Marko seeks revenge on him with the help Cyclone, Shriek, and Kangaroo, but the quartet are defeated by Boomerang and his allies Beetle, Speed Demon, and Overdrive.

As part of the All-New, All-Different Marvel, Marko is hired by Lorraine Monroe to stand guard over Tempest Monroe, the comatose fiancé of Spider-Man 2099. Upon discovering Tempest's whereabouts, Spider-Man 2099 distracts Marko long enough for Parker Industries to covertly relocate Tempest. Spider-Man 2099 subsequently tracks the escaped Man Mountain Marko down and beats him to near-death while demanding to know where to find Lorraine. Marko is recovered by the Fist, an offshoot of the Hand which heals him and further augments his strength and durability using technology provided by Tyler Stone. Tyler Stone later has Marko ambush Spider-Man 2099 while he absconds with the recovered Tempest.

During the Civil War II storyline, Man Mountain Marko worked with Kingpin's former minion Janus Jardeesh in the human trafficking business until they encounter Kingpin and Turk Barrett.

Marko later appears with Speed Demon robbing a pawn shop until they were caught by Rage. After a brief fight, they escape while Rage gets arrested by the Americops. Captain America later caught Speed Demon where he confessed to his and Man Mountain Marko's robbery of the pawn shop.

Marko and Ringer attack a book fair to rob it only to be defeated by Spider-Man.

During the Devil's Reign storyline, Man Mountain Marko appears as an inmate of the Myrmidon. Moon Knight is informed by 8-Ball that Man Mountain Marko is the "king of the cage". Moon Knight had to fight his way to earn the fight against Man Mountain Marko. When Man-Mountain Marko asks if Moon Knight is ready to die, Moon Knight stated that Raoul Bushman did that first. Man Mountain Marko gives Moon Knight a hard time as Moon Knight recalls his Mr. Knight alias meeting Man Mountain Marko's ex-wife Judith Cort and how their daughter has started taking after her father powers and all. After that flashback while not wanting Man Mountain Marko to go after his daughter, Moon Knight beats Man Mountain Marko into surrender as he advises him not to go after his ex-wife or his daughter if he gets out as he won't see them again. Moon Knight proceeds to induce blindness on Man Mountain Marko as the Thunderbolts agents come in.

Powers and abilities
Man Mountain Marko has been shown to have superhuman strength, stamina and sturdiness roughly comparable to, if not slightly exceeding, those of Spider-Man. It has been said that this is a result of steroids and genetic manipulation. He received a power upgrade from Tyler Stone after getting a vicious beating from Spider-Man 2099.  Though Spider-Man had previously broken many of Marko's bones, afterward Spider-Man was unable to do any damage to Marko.

Relatives
During the Fear Itself storyline, it is revealed that Man Mountain Marko had a cousin named Man Mountain Mario who was an inmate at the Raft. After the destruction of the Raft prison by Juggernaut, Man Mountain Mario helps defend Crossbones from thugs. While the two of them were trying to escape, Mario told Crossbones about his grandma, who helps criminals leave the border. Crossbones manages to escape from the Raft and returns the favor for Mario helping him by killing Mario to help with his escape.

Other versions

Marvel MAX
A Mick "Mountain" Marko appears in Cage MAX as a thug Tombstone hires to assault Luke Cage. After recovering from the attack, Cage pummels Mick and chains him to a street corner where he is shot to death by one of Tombstone's rivals.

MC2
The Marvel Comics 2 universe shows that Marko is still active in the MC2 universe, and is in charge of the Maggia of New York. He later appears in the new Spectacular Spider-Girl series as the underling for the new Maggia Crime boss of New York.

In other media
Man Mountain Marko appeared in the 1981 Spider-Man animated television series episode "Wrath of the Sub-Mariner" voiced by Jack Angel. This version is Silvermane's henchman and was with him when Spider-Man stopped Silvermane's limo, resulting in a brief fight between Spider-Man and Marko. While attending a meeting involving Silvermane, the Kingpin, Hammerhead, and Caesar Cicero on a yacht, Marko fights and is defeated by Namor before he is subdued by Spider-Man.

References

External links
 Man Mountain Marko at Marvelwikia.com
 Man Mountain Marko of Earth-982 at Marvelwikia.com
 Man Mountain Marko at Comic Vine
 Man Mountain Marko at the Appendix to the Marvel Handbook

Comics characters introduced in 1969
Characters created by John Romita Sr.
Characters created by Stan Lee
Fictional henchmen
Marvel Comics characters with superhuman strength
Marvel Comics mutates
Marvel Comics supervillains
Marvel Comics male supervillains
Spider-Man characters